Gerard Louis Goettel (August 5, 1928 – December 19, 2011) was a United States district judge of the United States District Court for the Southern District of New York.

Education and career

Born on August 5, 1928, in New York City, New York, Goettel received a Bachelor of Arts degree from Duke University in 1950. He received a Juris Doctor from Columbia Law School in 1955. He was a United States Coast Guard lieutenant from 1951 to 1953. He was an Assistant United States Attorney for the Southern District of New York from 1955 to 1958. He was deputy chief of the United States Attorney General's Special Group on Organized Crime from 1958 to 1959. He was in private practice of law in New York City from 1959 to 1962. He was counsel for the New York Life Insurance Company from 1962 to 1968. He was in private practice of law in New York City from 1968 to 1969. He was associate general counsel for the Overmyer Company from 1969 to 1971.

Federal judicial service

Goettel was a United States magistrate judge of the United States District Court for the Southern District of New York from 1971 to 1976. Goettel was nominated by President Gerald Ford on March 2, 1976, to a seat on the United States District Court for the Southern District of New York vacated by Judge Arnold Bauman. He was confirmed by the United States Senate on March 26, 1976, and received his commission on March 30, 1976. He assumed senior status on August 5, 1993, serving in that status until his death on December 19, 2011, in Danbury, Connecticut.

References

External links
 
 

1928 births
2011 deaths
Lawyers from New York City
Military personnel from New York City
Columbia Law School alumni
Duke University alumni
Judges of the United States District Court for the Southern District of New York
Assistant United States Attorneys
United States Coast Guard officers
United States district court judges appointed by Gerald Ford
20th-century American judges
United States magistrate judges